Olcay Gür (born 27 March 1991) is a Liechtensteiner footballer of Turkish descent who plays for FC Buchs.

International career 
He is a member of the Liechtenstein national football team and holds six caps, making his debut in a friendly against Azerbaijan on 6 February 2013.

References

External links 
 Olcay Gür at TFF.org
 
 

1991 births
Living people
People from Arsin, Turkey
Turkish footballers
Liechtenstein people of Turkish descent
Liechtenstein footballers
Liechtenstein international footballers
Liechtenstein under-21 international footballers
Association football defenders
USV Eschen/Mauren players
FC Schaan players
FC Chur 97 players
Gaziantep F.K. footballers
FV Ravensburg players
Austrian Regionalliga players